Aakashathinum Bhoomikkumidayil is a 2016 Indian Malayalam-language film directed by debutant Sandeep Ajith Kumar and scripted by "Peethambaran". The film features Neena Kurup, Musthafa and Shanavas (Rudran) in the lead roles.

Plot
The movie revolves around a village in northern Kerala where political murders happen and in such one incident a man is murdered while being mistaken for someone else. The families of both men are left stranded  and the film takes us through the incidents that happen to their children.

Cast
 Neena Kurup (as Kamala)
 Muhammad Musthafa
 Shanavas Shanu (as Rudran)
 Dinesh Eranjikkal
 Vinod Kozhikode
 Kozhikode Sarada
 Master Mohsen Salam
 Master Udith Nived
 Sini Sinu
 Prasida Vasu

Production 
The movie was the debut of director Sandeep Ajith Kumar who was earlier known for directing short films Marupadi and Oral.

The first look poster was released on 7 September 2015.

Music

The film's songs are composed by Gafoor M Khayam and lyrics written by Janardhanan Cheekilode.

References 

 

2010s Malayalam-language films
Films shot in Kannur
Films shot in Thalassery
Films shot in Kozhikode